Sir Rupert Beswicke Howorth  (13 July 1880 – 3 January 1964) was a British barrister and senior civil servant.

Howorth was the son of the politician, barrister and historian Sir Henry Hoyle Howorth and Katherine Brierley.

He entered the Board of Education in 1908 and transferred to HM Treasury in 1915. In 1919 he was seconded to the Cabinet Office, and he served as the Secretary at the Imperial Conferences of 1923, 1926, 1930 and 1937. In 1930 he became Deputy Secretary to the Cabinet, holding the position until 1942. He was made Knight Commander of the Order of St Michael and St George in 1933. Between 1938 and 1942 he was Clerk of the Privy Council. Howorth was made Knight Commander of the Royal Victorian Order in the 1942 Birthday Honours. He was Secretary of the Commissions of the Peace between 1945 and 1946.

References

1880 births
1964 deaths
British barristers
British civil servants
Clerks of the Privy Council
Companions of the Order of the Bath
English justices of the peace
Knights Commander of the Order of St Michael and St George
Knights Commander of the Royal Victorian Order